An energy certificate or energy attribute certificate is a transferable record or guarantee related to the amount of energy or material goods consumed by an energy conversion device in industrial production. A certificate may be in any form, including electronic, and lists attributes such as method, quality, compliance, and tracking.

Terminology
An energy attribute certificate (EAC) can include "a variety of instruments with different names, including certificates, tags, credits, or generator declarations." These certificates relate to various tracking systems worldwide.

Examples of energy certificates for renewable energy are:
 Green tags
 Guarantee of origin (GO)
 International REC Standard (I-REC Standard)
 Renewable Energy Certificates (RECs)
 Renewable Energy Credits
 Tradable Instruments for Global Renewables (TIGRs)
 Tradable Renewable Certificates (TRCs)
 Tradable Renewable Energy Certificates (TRECs)

Purpose and examples by region
Energy certificates issued under national legislation typically provide evidence of compliance. Electricity producers, suppliers, or consumers use these certificates when required to use a specific type of energy or to qualify for financial support. Qualifying plants often produce electricity from renewable sources or high-quality co-generators. 

Some examples are:

 United Kingdom: Renewable Obligation Certificates (ROCs) issued under the Renewables Obligation
 United Kingdom: Levy Exemption Certificates (LECs) issued under the Climate Change Levy. 
 Italy: Certificati Verdi
 Sweden and Belgium: Elcertifikat

Most of these support schemes are national. The Climate Change Levy is a notable exception; the regulator issues LECs to electricity producers in the United Kingdom and several European countries that export to the UK. 

The European Union create internationally transferable "guarantees of origin:" It provides proof to consumers of the source of their electricity, as required by Directive 2009/72/EC. Electricity suppliers use these guarantees when calculating the proportions of energy sources (fossil fuel, nuclear, etc.) in their supplied energy. Governments use them to calculate the residual mix—the blend of electricity sources produced in a country, adjusted for imports and exports.

Directive 2009/28/EC and Directive 2012/27/EC require a guarantee of origin for renewable energy and highly-efficient co-generation. The European Union uses these certificates, as do countries bound by treaties such as the European Economic Area and the Energy Community. The Association of Issuing Bodies uses the European Energy Certificate System to facilitate issuing, using, and transferring of these certificates.

Other countries that use energy certificates include Australia, Japan, Turkey, and the United States of America.

Overview of energy certificate systems
The following table provides an overview of energy certificate systems by countries. This table is incomplete; you can help by expanding it.

Notes

References

External links 
 The Environmental Tracking Network of North America (ETNNA)
 RECS International (RECS)
 Energy Attribute Certificates
 Overview of the different certificate systems worldwide

Energy policy